James W. Coleman was an American college football, college basketball, and track coach. He served as the head football coach at Georgetown College in Georgetown, Kentucky from 1922 to 1923, the University of Akron from 1924 to 1925, and Minot State Teacher's College—now known as Minot State University—in Minot, North Dakota from 1927 to 1935, compiling a career college football coaching record of 39–36–10. Coleman also coached the men's basketball team at Akron for one season in 1924–25, tallying a mark of 8–5. He played college football at the University of Arkansas. Coleman was hired in 1936 as head track coach and assistant football coach at the University of Nevada.

Head coaching record

Football

Basketball

References

Year of birth missing
Year of death missing
Akron Zips football coaches
Akron Zips men's basketball coaches
Arkansas Razorbacks football players
Georgetown Tigers football coaches
Georgetown Tigers men's basketball coaches
Minot State Beavers football coaches
Minot State Beavers men's basketball coaches
Nevada Wolf Pack football coaches
Nevada Wolf Pack track and field coaches